Applewood is the wood of an apple tree. It can add flavor to dishes, such as "Applewood smoked bacon". "Applewood" can also refer to any of the following:

Places
 Applewood, Colorado, USA
 Applewood, Swords, Ireland
 Applewood Farm, Connecticut, USA
 Applewood Park, Calgary, Canada
 Applewood (Flint, Michigan), USA

Other
 Applewood cheese
 Applewood Books